Eppo Egbert Willem Bruins (born 19 September 1969) is a Dutch politician and physicist who served as a member of the House of Representatives for the Christian Union (CU) from 2015 to 2021.

Early life and education
Bruins was born on 19 September 1969 in Apeldoorn, Gelderland. He attended high school at the preparatory scientific education level at the Myrtus College in his hometown between 1982 and 1987.

Bruins subsequently went to the Utrecht University, where he graduated with an Master of Science (MSc) degree in physics in 1991.

In 1995, he obtained his PhD degree in mathematics and physics from the Utrecht University with a thesis entitled "The magnetic form factor of the neutron".

Career 
Bruins later lived in the United States, where he was a postdoctoral researcher at the Massachusetts Institute of Technology (MIT) from 1995 to 1997. He then returned to the Netherlands, where he was a project coordinator at his former training institute FOM between 1997 and 2004, as well as subsequently director of the Leiden Institute of Physics of the Leiden University from 2004 to 2007, before his time as director of the FOM between 2007 and 2015.

Politics
Bruins was a member of the Christian Democratic Appeal (CDA), but switched over to the socially more conservative Christian Union in 2011.
In the parliamentary election of 2012, Bruins was placed as number six on the Christian Union list but was not elected.

On 2 December 2015, he became member of the House of Representatives, when he replaced former party leader Arie Slob who had resigned as a parliamentarian. Bruins had previously served as editor-in-chief of the magazine of Christian Union's scientific institute.

In the parliamentary election of 2021, he was placed seventh on the party list, failing to win reelection. In 2023, following the resignation of then party leader Gert-Jan Segers as a parliamentarian, a seat in Parliament was proposed to Bruins, who declined to return. The seat went to Nico Drost instead.

Personal life
Bruins became religious at age 18. He first belonged to the Reformed Association in the Protestant Church in the Netherlands and later became a Baptist.

References

External links
  Parlement.com biography

1969 births
Living people
Christian Union (Netherlands) politicians
Dutch Baptists
21st-century Dutch physicists
Members of the House of Representatives (Netherlands)
People from Apeldoorn
Utrecht University alumni
Converts to Baptist denominations
Former Calvinist and Reformed Christians
21st-century Dutch politicians